The intermediate sprints classification, also known as the  classification (French for "hot points"), was a secondary competition in the Tour de France that was contested between 1966 and 1989. From 1984 onwards, the leader was indicated by the red jersey.

History 

The classification began in 1966. Because the non-finish sprints also awarded points for the points classification, the intermediate sprints classification was considered redundant and removed from the Tour in 1989.

Intermediate sprints classification results

References 

Tour de France classifications and awards
Cycling jerseys